Pure and Simple may refer to:

 Pure and Simple (Joan Jett album), 1994
 Pure & Simple (Dolly Parton album), 2016
 "Pure and Simple" (song), a 2001 song by Hear'Say